Alan Taylor (born January 13, 1959) is an American television director, film director, screenwriter, and television producer. He is best known for his work on television series such as The Sopranos, Sex and the City, Mad Men, and Game of Thrones. He also directed films such as Palookaville, Thor: The Dark World, Terminator Genisys, and The Many Saints of Newark.

In 2007 Taylor won a Primetime Emmy Award for Outstanding Directing for a Drama Series for The Sopranos episode "Kennedy and Heidi". In 2008 and 2018 he was also nominated in the same category for the Mad Men episode "Smoke Gets in Your Eyes" and the Game of Thrones episode "Beyond the Wall", respectively.

Early life 
Taylor's father, James J. Taylor, was a private in the U.S. army translating for Voice of America, stationed in Yokohama, who subsequently held numerous jobs before becoming a videographer in Washington, D.C. Taylor's mother, Mimi Cazort, was curator emerita for the National Gallery of Canada. His sister is the indie rock musician Anna Domino.

He spent part of his life in Manor Park, Ottawa, Canada, and attended Manor Park Public School and Lisgar Collegiate Institute high school. As part of the Communications Club at Lisgar, he acted in its production of The Mouse That Roared. He went on to major in history at the University of Toronto and then at New York City's Columbia University before transferring to New York University in his late 20s to study film under instructors including director Martin Scorsese.

Career 
Taylor has directed for numerous programs on both network television and premium cable, most often on HBO.

Taylor's early work on television include work on The Sopranos, Sex and the City, and The West Wing. Taylor joined the crew of the HBO western drama Deadwood as a director for the first season in 2004. Taylor directed the pilot episodes of Mad Men ("Smoke Gets in Your Eyes") and Bored to Death as well as subsequent episodes of each. He joined the HBO series Game of Thrones, directing seven episodes including critically acclaimed season 1 episode "Baelor." He worked on a television adaptation of the Strugatsky brothers' 1971 science fiction novel Roadside Picnic for the WGN America network. Besides his television work, Taylor's early films include Palookaville, The Emperor's New Clothes, and Kill the Poor.

In the 2010s, Taylor began working on large budget blockbuster films. He was hired to direct Thor: The Dark World (2013) a superhero film and sequel to 2011's Thor. He was approached by Marvel producer Kevin Feige following director Patty Jenkins exit from the project and hoped he would inject a darker tone into the project after seeing Taylor's work on Game of Thrones. Taylor's next film was Terminator Genisys, a film that Taylor hoped to fix following his reading of the script, citing his love of the first two Terminator films. After directing nine episodes for the HBO series The Sopranos, Taylor was approached by show creator David Chase to return to direct the 2021 prequel film The Many Saints of Newark.

In August 2022, it was announced that Taylor was hired to direct multiple episodes of the second season of House of the Dragon.

Personal life 
Taylor currently lives in Brooklyn, New York, he has three children with award-winning makeup artist Nicki Ledermann

Directing filmography 
Film
 

Television
That Burning Question (1988)
Homicide: Life on the Street TV series
episode "Mercy"
episode "Blood Ties"
episode "The Wedding"
episode "A Dog and Pony Show"
episode "Autofocus"
episode "The True Test"
episode "Forgive Us Our Trespasses"
Oz (1997) TV series
episode 1.06 "To Your Health"
episode 2.06 "Strange Bedfellows"
Trinity (1998) TV series
episode "Breaking In, Breaking Out, Breaking Up, Breaking Down"
Sex and the City (1998) TV series
episode 2.09 "Old Dogs, New Dicks"
episode 2.14 "The Fuck Buddy"
episode 4.15 "Change of a Dress"
episode 4.16 "Ring a Ding-Ding"
episode 6.07 "The Post-it Always Sticks Twice"
episode 6.08 "The Catch"
Now and Again (1999) TV series
episode "Over Easy"
The Sopranos (1999) TV series
episode 1.06 "Pax Soprana"
episode 4.10 "The Strong, Silent Type"
episode 5.02 "Rat Pack"
episode 6.04 "The Fleshy Part of the Thigh"
episode 6.09 "The Ride"
episode 6.12 "Kaisha"
episode 6.14 "Stage 5"
episode 6.18 "Kennedy and Heidi"
episode 6.20 "The Blue Comet"
The West Wing (1999) TV series
episode 1.08 "Enemies"
episode 1.16 "20 Hours in L.A."
Six Feet Under (2001) TV series
episode 2.08 "It's the Most Wonderful Time of the Year"
Keen Eddie (2003)
episode "Sticky Fingers"
Carnivàle (2003) TV series
episode 2.07 "Damascus, NE"
Deadwood (2004) TV series
episode 1.04 "Here Was a Man"
episode 2.04 "Requiem for a Gleet"
Lost (2004) TV series
episode 2.04 "Everybody Hates Hugo"
Rome (2005) TV series
episode 1.10 "Triumph"
episode 1.12 "Kalends of February"
Big Love (2006) TV series
episode 1.05 "Affair"
Mad Men (2007) TV series
episode 1.01 "Smoke Gets in Your Eyes"
episode 1.02 "Ladies Room"
episode 1.12 "Nixon vs. Kennedy"
episode 2.12 "The Mountain King"
Boardwalk Empire (2010) TV series
episode 1.05 "Nights in Ballygran"
Game of Thrones (2011) TV series
episode 1.09 "Baelor"
episode 1.10 "Fire and Blood"
episode 2.01 "The North Remembers"
episode 2.02 "The Night Lands"
episode 2.08 "The Prince of Winterfell"
episode 2.10 "Valar Morghulis"
episode 7.06 "Beyond the Wall"

References

External links 

1959 births
American film directors
American male screenwriters
American television directors
American television producers
Hugo Award winners
Primetime Emmy Award winners
Living people
Place of birth missing (living people)
Directors Guild of America Award winners